Linkola is a Finnish surname. Notable people with the surname include:

Anna-Liisa Linkola (1914–1999), Finnish politician
Jukka Linkola (born 1955), Finnish jazz pianist and classical composer
Kaarlo Linkola (1888–1942), Finnish botanist
Pentti Linkola (1932–2020), Finnish environmentalist, philosopher and writer

Finnish-language surnames